Gastrotheca christiani is a species of frog in the family Hemiphractidae.
It is endemic to Argentina.
Its natural habitats are subtropical or tropical moist lowland forests and rocky areas.
It is threatened by habitat loss.

References

Gastrotheca
Amphibians of Argentina
Amphibians of the Andes
Endemic fauna of Argentina
Taxonomy articles created by Polbot
Amphibians described in 1967